Brand New / Safety in Numbers is a split EP by the American bands Brand New and Safety in Numbers, released on March 6, 2002. The split was originally between Brand New and Reggie and the Full Effect, but plans fell through.

After recording their debut album Your Favorite Weapon in 2001, Long Island band Brand New teamed up with their then labelmate Safety in Numbers for a split EP.  Each band contributed a new song and a cover song.  Brand New gave the EP a B-side called "Moshi Moshi" and a cover of the Love Spit Love song "Am I Wrong" which was popularized on the indie scene in the mid-90s. Safety In Numbers, a group started by Hot Rod Circuit leadman Andy Jackson, had a song called "No Use" and a cover of the popular Journey song "Faithfully".  The EP was available to fans of both bands through internet retailers and was specifically sold with the pre-sale for Brand New's full-length Deja Entendu (2003) album.

Track listing

Personnel
Brand New
 Jesse Lacey – vocals, rhythm guitar
 Vinnie Accardi – lead guitar, backing vocals
 Garrett Tierney – bass, backing vocals
 Brian Lane – drums, percussion
 Natalie Iozzio – flute 

Safety in Numbers
 Andy Jackson – vocals, lead guitar
 Chris Flaherty – backing vocals, rhythm guitar
 Jake Turner – rhythm guitar
 Brona Jackson – backing vocals, bass
 Jeff Turner – drums

References

2002 EPs
Brand New (band) EPs
Triple Crown Records EPs